Henry Edmund Wylie (1878–1951) was a sailor from Canada, who represented his country at the 1932 Summer Olympics in Los Angeles, US.

Sources
 

1878 births
1951 deaths
Canadian male sailors (sport)
Sailors at the 1932 Summer Olympics – Star
Olympic sailors of Canada
Irish emigrants to Canada (before 1923)